Neil D. Humphrey (May 20, 1928 – April 30, 2018) was an American academic.

Humphrey attended Idaho State University, the University of Denver, and Brigham Young University. Early in his professional career, he was involved in public administration in Colorado. In 1955 he moved to Nevada and headed the Nevada Taxpayers Association. He was made Nevada State Budget director by Gov. Grant Sawyer. He was next recruited as vice president for finance at the University of Nevada. He was chancellor of the University of Nevada system from 1967 to 1977.

Humphrey was the president of the University of Alaska System in 1977, president of the University of Nevada System, and president of Youngstown State University  from 1984 to 1992.

References

External links
Obituary of Humphrey at Legacy.com

1928 births
Brigham Young University alumni
Idaho State University alumni
2018 deaths
People from Idaho Falls, Idaho
Presidents of the University of Alaska System
University of Denver alumni
University of Nevada, Reno people
Youngstown State University people